The 1981 Hawaii Rainbow Warriors football team was an American football team that represented the University of Hawaii in the Western Athletic Conference (WAC) during the 1981 NCAA Division I-A football season. In their fifth season under head coach Dick Tomey, the Rainbow Warriors compiled an 9–2 record (5–1 against WAC opponents), placed second in the WAC, and outscored opponents by a total of 328 to 130.

Schedule

References

Hawaii
Hawaii Rainbow Warriors football seasons
Hawaii Rainbow Warriors football